Darragh Ryan (born 21 May 1980 in Cuckfield, West Sussex), is a former footballer who last played for Southern Stars in the Victorian State League Division 1.

Playing career 
He began his career with Brighton & Hove Albion, for whom he played nine league games, scoring twice. Ryan then moved on to play for another Sussex outfit, Crawley Town. Following this, the player moved to Ireland, signing for UCD. He made his debut for them at home to Waterford, and after a number of years at the club, he returned to England, where he played non-League football with Bognor Regis Town, Worthing and Haywards Heath Town. Ryan then returned to UCD, this time for a more brief spell. Following this, he signed for Cork City where he was part of the FAI cup winning side in 2006 against Longford Town and the 2007 Setanta cup winning team against Glentoran. He then moved on to League of Ireland side St Patrick's Athletic Who reached the play-off stages of the Europa League, After victories over Valletta of Malta, Krylya Sovetov in Russia they were knocked out by Steaua Bucharest.

In January 2010, Ryan signed for Conference National side Stevenage Borough on a non-contract basis. He also played at left back in the FA Vase sixth round for Whitehawk at Gresley Rovers, to solve an injury crisis as a favour for the Hawks' manager Darren Freeman. He was later released by Stevenage Borough after failing to make a first-team appearance. Shortly after his release, he trialled with one of his former clubs, Crawley Town. Several months after this appearance, it was announced that Ryan had been signed by Crawley. This was the second time that the player had signed for Crawley, having spent time at the club several years previously. Ryan left the club by mutual agreement in September 2010.

Personal life 
Ryan's father Gerry played eighteen times for Ireland between 1978 and 1984, scoring once, at home in a European Championship defeat to West Germany.

References

External links 
Ryan sent off St Pats
Ryan to return to Belfield Park
Ryan joins Cork City's ranks

1980 births
Living people
People from Cuckfield
Brighton & Hove Albion F.C. players
Crawley Town F.C. players
University College Dublin A.F.C. players
Bognor Regis Town F.C. players
Worthing F.C. players
Cork City F.C. players
St Patrick's Athletic F.C. players
Stevenage F.C. players
Whitehawk F.C. players
English Football League players
League of Ireland players
Haywards Heath Town F.C. players
Association football midfielders
English footballers